List of bus operating companies in Japan lists Japanese bus operators. The list includes companies operating now. Operators are listed from north to south by prefecture of its headquarters.

The list includes transit buses, highway buses, or sightseeing buses. Operators of lines not open to passers-by, such as charter only companies, or schools operating school buses are not listed.

The list also excludes  lines. It refers to feeder bus transits with usually smaller vehicles, operated by municipalities. See :ja:日本のコミュニティバス一覧 for the list. "Normal" municipal bus transits (kōei basu , such as Toei Bus of Tōkyō) are listed here.

Trolleybuses and guided buses are listed in the List of railway companies in Japan, as they are classified as railway in the country.

For the operators in Kantō and Kansai, accepted fare collection cards are indicated as below. Other operators may accept different cards.
C : Operators currently accepting magnetic Common Bus Card.
PA : Operators currently accepting smart card PASMO.
S : Operators currently accepting magnetic  Surutto Kansai.
Pi : Operators currently accepting smart card PiTaPa.

English names might be tentative.

Hokkaidō

Abashiri Bus 網走バス
Abashiri Kankō Kōtsū 網走観光交通
Akan Bus 阿寒バス
Asahikawa Denki Kidō 旭川電気軌道
Atsuma Bus あつまバス
Chitose Sōgo Kankō Bus 千歳相互観光バス
Dōhoku Bus 道北バス
Dōnan Bus 道南バス
Engan Bus 沿岸バス
Furano Bus ふらのバス
Hakodate Bus 函館バス
Hakodate Taxi (Hakodate Teisan Bus) 函館タクシー (函館帝産バス)
Hiyama Kankō Bus 檜山観光バス
Hokkaido Chuo Bus 北海道中央バス
Niseko Bus ニセコバス
Sapporo Daiichi Kankō Bus 札幌第一観光バス
Sorachi Chūō Bus 空知中央バス
Hokkaidō Kitami Bus 北海道北見バス
Hokkaidō Takushoku Bus 北海道拓殖バス
Hokumon Bus 北紋バス
Hokuto Kōtsū 北都交通
JR Group JRグループ
JR Hokkaidō Bus ジェイ・アール北海道バス
Kushiro Bus くしろバス
Meishi Bus 名士バス
Nemuro Kōtsū 根室交通
Okushiri Kankō 奥尻観光
Sapporo Bankei 札幌ばんけい
Shari Bus 斜里バス
Shibetsu Kidō 士別軌道
Sōya Bus 宗谷バス
The northernmost operator.
Tentetsu Bus てんてつバス
Tokachi Bus 十勝バス
Tōkyū Group 東急グループ
Jōtetsu じょうてつ
Yūbari Railway (Yūtetsu Bus) 夕張鉄道 (夕鉄バス)

Tōhoku region

Aomori Prefecture
Aomori City Transportation Division (Aomori City Bus) 青森市交通部 (青森市営バス)
Hachinohe City Transportation Division (Hachinohe City Bus) 八戸市交通部 (八戸市営バス)
Kokusai Kōgyō Group 国際興業グループ
Towada Kankō Dentetsu 十和田観光電鉄
Kōnan Bus 弘南バス
Nanbu Bus 南部バス
Shimokita Kōtsū 下北交通

Akita Prefecture
Akita Chuoukoutsu 秋田中央交通
Akita Chuou Transport 秋田中央トランスポート
Kokusai Kōgyō Group 国際興業グループ
Shūhoku Bus 秋北バス
Ugo Kōtsū 羽後交通

Iwate Prefecture
Iwate Kenpoku Bus 岩手県北自動車 (岩手県北バス)
Iwate Kyūkō Bus 岩手急行バス
Kokusai Kōgyō Group 国際興業グループ
Iwatekenkōtsū 岩手県交通
Hayachine Bus 早池峰バス

Miyagi Prefecture
Ayashi Kankō Bus 愛子観光バス
Higashi Nippon Express 東日本急行
JR Group JRグループ
JR Bus Tōhoku ジェイアールバス東北
Meitetsu Group 名鉄グループ
Miyagi Transportation 宮城交通
Miyakō Bus ミヤコーバス
Sendai City Transportation Bureau (Sendai City Bus) 仙台市交通局 (仙台市営バス)
Tōhoku Kyūkō Bus 東北急行バス

Yamagata Prefecture
Asahi Kōtsū あさひ交通
Atsumi Kōtsū あつみ交通
Mogamigawa Koutsuu 最上川交通
Shōnai Kōtsū 庄内交通
Shōnai Kōtsū Kankō Bus Hire 庄内交通観光バス・ハイヤー
Yamakō Bus 山交バス
Yuza Kōtsū ゆざ交通

Fukushima Prefecture
Aizu Bus 会津乗合自動車 (会津バス)
Bandai Tōto Bus 磐梯東都バス
Fukushima Transportation 福島交通
Sakura Kōtsū 桜交通
Shin Jōban Kōtsū 新常磐交通

Kantō region

Ibaraki Prefecture
Hitachi Dentetsu Transportation Service 日立電鉄交通サービス
Ibaraki Kōtsū 茨城交通
Keisei Group 京成グループ
Kantō Railway 関東鉄道
Kantetsu Green Bus 関鉄グリーンバス
Kantetsu Kankō Bus 関鉄観光バス
Kantetsu Purple Bus 関鉄パープルバス
Ōtone Kōtsū Motor 大利根交通自動車

Tochigi Prefecture
Michinori Holdings :ja:みちのりホールディングス
Kanto Transportation 関東自動車
Tōya Kōtsū 東野交通
Tōbu Group 東武グループ
Nikkō Kōtsū 日光交通
Tōbu Bus Nikkō 東武バス日光

Gunma Prefecture
Gunma Bus 群馬バス
Gunma Chūō Bus 群馬中央バス
Jōshin Dentetsu 上信電鉄
Nagai Transportation (Jōshū Kankō Bus) 永井運輸 (上州観光バス)
Nippon Chūō Bus 日本中央バス
Tōbu Group 東武グループ
Kan-etsu Kōtsū 関越交通
Vortex Ark ボルテックスアーク
Yajima Taxi 矢島タクシー

Saitama Prefecture
Chichibu Railway Sightseeing Bus 秩父鉄道観光バス
Daiwa Kankō Bus 大和観光自動車
Eagle Bus イーグルバス
Hokuto Kōtsū 北斗交通
Iijima Kōgyō 飯島興業
Japan Tarō's ジャパンタローズ
Kyōdō Kankō Bus 協同観光バス
Life Bus ライフバス
Mētō Kankō メートー観光
Musashi Kankō 武蔵観光
My Sky Kōtsū マイスカイ交通
Seibu Group 西武グループ
Seibu Bus 西武バス C PA
Seibu Kankō Bus 西武観光バス C
Tōbu Group 東武グループ
Asahi Motor 朝日自動車
Ibakyū Motor 茨城急行自動車
Kawagoe Motor 川越観光自動車 C
Kokusai Jūō 国際十王交通 C
Tōbu Bus West 東武バスウエスト C PA

Chiba Prefecture
Be-Transse Group ビィー・トランセホールディングス
Aska Kōtsū あすか交通
Heiwa Kōtsū 平和交通
Keisei Group 京成グループ
Chiba Kōtsū 千葉交通
Chibakō Taxi (Chibakō Bus) 千葉交タクシー (ちばこうバス)
Chiba Chūō Bus 千葉中央バス C
Chiba City Bus ちばシティバス C
Chiba Flower Bus ちばフラワーバス C
Chiba Green Bus ちばグリーンバス C
Chiba Kaihin Kōtsū 千葉海浜交通 C
Chiba Nairiku Bus 千葉内陸バス C
Chiba Rainbow Bus ちばレインボーバス C
Funabashi Shin-Keisei Bus 船橋新京成バス C
Hokusō Kōtsū 北総交通
Keisei Bus 京成バス
Keisei Bus System 京成バスシステム
Keisei Transit Bus 京成トランジットバス C
Kujūkuri Railway 九十九里鉄道
Kominato Railway 小湊鐵道
Matsudo Shin-Keisei Bus 松戸新京成バス C
Narashino Shin-Keisei Bus 習志野新京成バス C
Narita Airport Transport 成田空港交通
Sakura Kōtsū 佐倉交通
Tōkyō Bay City Kōtsū  東京ベイシティ交通 C
Nittō Kōtsū 日東交通
Amaha Nittō Bus 天羽日東バス
Kamogawa Nittō Bus 鴨川日東バス
Tateyama Nittō Bus 館山日東バス
Tōbu Group 東武グループ
Bandō Bus 阪東自動車
Tōbu Bus East 東武バスイースト C
Tōyō Bus 東洋バス
Chiba Seaside Bus 千葉シーサイドバス

Tokyo Metropolis
Airport Transport Service
Daishintō 大新東
Fujikyū Group 富士急グループ
Fuji Express フジエクスプレス
Hachijō Town Public Enterprise Division Transportation Section (Hachijō Town Bus) 八丈町企業課運輸係 (八丈町営バス)
Hato Bus はとバス
Sightseeing buses only.
Hinomaru Limousine 日の丸リムジン
HMC Tokyo HMC東京
Hitachi Jidōsha Kōtsū 日立自動車交通
JR East Group
JR Bus Kantō ジェイアールバス関東
JR Bus Tech ジェイアールバステック
Kantō Bus 関東バス C PA
Keikyū Group
Keihin Kyūkō Bus 京浜急行バス C PA
Haneda Keikyū Bus 羽田京急バス C PA
Keiō Group
Keiō Dentetsu BusC PA
Keiō Bus Chūō 京王バス中央 C PA
Keiō Bus Higashi 京王バス東 C PA
Keiō Bus Koganei 京王バス小金井 C PA
Keiō Bus Minami 京王バス南 C
Nishi Tōkyō Bus 西東京バス C
Keisei Group
Keisei Bus 京成バス C PA
Keisei Town Bus 京成タウンバス C PA
km Group kmグループ
km Kankō Bus ケイエム観光バス
Kokusai Kōgyō Group 国際興業グループ
Kokusai Kōgyō Bus 国際興業バス C PA
Miyake Village Public Enterprise Division Transportation Sector (Miyake Village Bus) 三宅村企業課運輸係 (三宅村営バス)
Odakyū Group
Odakyū Bus 小田急バス C PA
Odakyū City Bus 小田急シティバス C PA
Odakyū Hakone Highway Bus 小田急箱根高速バス
Tachikawa Bus 立川バス C
City Bus Tachikawa シティバス立川 C
Ogasawara Village Industry And Tourism Division (Ogasawara Village Bus) 小笠原村産業観光課 (小笠原村営バス)
Ōshima Ryokaku Motor (Ōshima Bus) 大島旅客自動車 (大島バス)
Seibu Group
Seibu Motor 西武自動車 C
Shinnihon Sightseeing Bus 新日本観光自動車
Tōbu Group
Tōbu Bus Central 東武バスセントラル C PA
Tōhoku Kyūkō Bus 東北急行バス
Tōkyō Metropolitan Bureau of Transportation (Toei Bus)C PA
Tōkyū Group
Tōkyū Bus 東急バス C PA
Tōkyū Transsés 東急トランセ C

Kanagawa Prefecture
Fujikyū Group 富士急グループ
Fujikyū Shōnan Bus 富士急湘南バス C
Kawasaki City Transportation Bureau (Kawasaki City Bus) 川崎市交通局 (川崎市営バス) C PA
Keikyū Group 京急グループ
Kawasaki Tsurumi Rinkō Bus 川崎鶴見臨港バス C PA
Shōnan Keikyū Bus 湘南京急バス C
Yokohama Keikyū Bus 横浜京急バス C PA
Odakyū Group 小田急グループ
Enoshima Electric Railway 江ノ島電鉄 C PA
Enoden Bus 江ノ電バス C PA
Hakone Tozan Bus 箱根登山バス C PA
Kanagawa Chūō Kōtsū 神奈川中央交通 C PA
Fujisawa Kanakō Bus 藤沢神奈交バス C
Sagami Kanakō Bus 相模神奈交バス C
Shōnan Kanakō Bus 湘南神奈交バス C
Tsukui Kanakō Bus 津久井神奈交バス C
Yokohama Kanakō Bus 横浜神奈交バス C
Sōtetsu Group 相鉄グループ
Sōtetsu Bus 相鉄バス C PA
Tōkyō Bay Service 東京ベイサービス
Yokohama City Transportation Bureau (Yokohama City Bus) 横浜市交通局 (横浜市営バス) C PA
Yokohama Traffic Development 横浜交通開発 C

Chūbu region

Niigata Prefecture
Echigo Kōtsū 越後交通
Kita Echigo Kankō Bus 北越後観光バス
Minami Echigo Kankō Bus 南越後観光バス
Kubiki Motor 頸城自動車
Itoigawa Bus 糸魚川バス
Keihoku Kankō Bus 頸北観光バス
Keinan Bus 頸南バス
Kubikino Bus くびき野バス
Tōkei Bus 東頸バス
Niigata Kōtsū 新潟交通
Niigata Kōtsū Kankō Bus 新潟交通観光バス
Niigata Kōtsū Sado 新潟交通佐渡
Tainai Kōtsū 胎内交通

Toyama Prefecture
Dolphin Traffic イルカ交通
Uozu Kotsu 魚津交通
Kaiō Kōtsū 海王交通
Tateyama Kurobe Kankō 立山黒部貫光
Toyama Chihō Railway 富山地方鉄道
Toyama Chitetsu Hokuto Bus 富山地鉄北斗バス
Kaetsunō Bus 加越能バス

Ishikawa Prefecture
Meitetsu Group 名鉄グループ
Hokuriku Railroad 北陸鉄道
Hokutetsu Kanazawa Bus 北鉄金沢バス
Hokutetsu Noto Bus 北鉄能登バス
Hokutetsu Okunoto Bus 北鉄奥能登バス
Kaga Hakusan Bus 加賀白山バス
Kaga Onsen Bus 加賀温泉バス
Komatsu Bus 小松バス
Notojima Kōtsū 能登島交通

Fukui Prefecture
Keihan Group 京阪グループ
Keifuku Bus 京福バス
Meitetsu Group 名鉄グループ
Fukui Railway 福井鉄道
Yamato Kōtsū 大和交通

Gifu Prefecture
Heiwa Corporation 平和コーポレーション
Meitetsu Group 名鉄グループ
Gifu Bus 岐阜乗合自動車 (岐阜バス)
Gifu Bus Community 岐阜バスコミュニティ
Gifu Bus Community Hachiman 岐阜バスコミュニティ八幡
Gifu Bus Kankou 岐阜バス観光
Kita Ena Kōtsū 北恵那交通
Nōhi Noriai Jidōsha (Nōhi Bus) 濃飛乗合自動車 (濃飛バス)
Tohnoh Tetsudou (Tohtetsu Bus) 東濃鉄道 (東鉄バス)

Nagano Prefecture
Chikuma Bus 千曲バス
Chūō Alps Kankō 中央アルプス観光
Ina Bus 伊那バス
Kanden Amenix (Kita Alps Kōtsū) 関電アメニックス (北アルプス交通)
Matsumoto Electric Railway (Matsumoto Dentetsu Bus) 松本電気鉄道 (松本電鉄バス)
Alpico Highland Bus アルピコハイランドバス
Kawanakajima Bus 川中島バス
Suwa Bus 諏訪バス
Nagaden Bus 長電バス
Ontake Kōtsū おんたけ交通
Seibu Group 西武グループ
Seibu Kōgen Bus 西武高原バス
Shinnan Koutsu 信南交通
Syoei Kōsoku Unyu (Dot Com Liner) 昌栄高速運輸（どっとこむライナー）
Travis Japan (Hana Bus Kankō) トラビスジャパン（花バス観光）
Kusakaru Kōtsū 草軽交通
Ueda Bus 上田バス

Yamanashi Prefecture
Fujikyū Group 富士急グループ
Fuji Kyūkō 富士急行
Fujikyū Heiwa Kankō 富士急平和観光
Fujikyū Yamanashi Bus 富士急山梨バス
Kokusai Kōgyō Group 国際興業グループ
Yamanashi Kōtsū 山梨交通
Yamakō Town Coach 山交タウンコーチ
Yamanashi Kashikiri Taxi 山梨貸切自動車

Shizuoka Prefecture
Ensyū Railway (Entetsu Bus) 遠州鉄道 (遠鉄バス)
Akiha Bus Service 秋葉バスサービス
Kakegawa Bus Service 掛川バスサービス
Fujikyū Group 富士急グループ
Fujikyū City Bus 富士急シティバス
Fujikyū Shizuoka Bus 富士急静岡バス
Odakyū Group
Tōkai Bus 東海自動車
Izu Tōkai Bus 伊豆東海バス
Minami Izu Tōkai Bus 南伊豆東海バス
Naka Izu Tōkai Bus 中伊豆東海バス
Nishi Izu Tōkai Bus 西伊豆東海バス
Numazu Tozan Tōkai Bus 沼津登山東海バス
Shin Tōkai Bus 新東海バス
Hamamatsu Bus 浜松バス
Meitetsu Group 名鉄グループ
Ōigawa Railway (Daitetsu Bus) 大井川鐵道 (大鐵バス)
Seibu Group 西武グループ
Izu Hakone Bus 伊豆箱根バス
Shizutetsu Justline しずてつジャストライン

Aichi Prefecture
Aoi Kōtsū あおい交通
Hōei Kōtsū 豊栄交通
JR Group JRグループ
JR Tōkai Bus ジェイアール東海バス
Kintetsu Group 近鉄グループ
Meihan Kintetsu Bus 名阪近鉄バス
Meitetsu Group 名鉄グループ
Chita Noriai (Chita Bus) 知多乗合 (知多バス)
Meitetsu Bus 名鉄バス
Meitetsu Bus Chūbu 名鉄バス中部
Meitetsu Bus Tōbu 名鉄バス東部
Meitetsu Kankō Bus 名鉄観光バス
Toyotetsu Bus 豊鉄バス
Transportation Bureau City of Nagoya (Nagoya City Bus) 名古屋市交通局 (名古屋市営バス)

Mie Prefecture
Sangi Railway (Sangi Bus) 三岐鉄道 (三岐バス)
Chūnichi Rinkai Bus 中日臨海バス
Kintetsu Group 近鉄グループ
Mie Kōtsū (Sanco Bus) 三重交通 (三交バス)
Happū Bus 八風バス
Mie Kyūkō Motor 三重急行自動車
Sanco Ise Shima Kōtsū 三交伊勢志摩交通
Sanco Nanki Kōtsū 三交南紀交通

Kansai region

Ōsaka Prefecture
Hankyū Hanshin Holdings Group 阪急阪神ホールディングスグループ
Hankyū Bus 阪急バス S Pi
Hankyū Sight Seeing Bus 阪急観光バス
Ōsaka Airport Transport 大阪空港交通
Hanshin Electric Railway 阪神電気鉄道 S
Hokkō Kankō Bus 北港観光バス
JR Group JRグループ
West JR Bus 西日本ジェイアールバス
Kintetsu Group 近鉄グループ
Kintetsu Bus 近鉄バス S
Kokusai Kōgyō Group 国際興業グループ
Kokusai Kōgyō Ōsaka 国際興業大阪
Kongō Motor (Kongō Bus) 金剛自動車 (金剛バス)
Kyōto Kyukō Bus 京都急行バス（プリンセスライン）
Mizuma Railway 水間鉄道
Nankai Group 南海グループ
Kansai Airport Transportation 関西空港交通
Nankai Bus 南海バス
Nankai Wing Bus Kanaoka 南海ウイングバス金岡
Nankai Wing Bus Nanbu 南海ウイングバス南部
Nihon Kōtsū 日本交通
Nikkō City Bus 日交シティバス
Nihonjō Taxi 日本城タクシー
Osaka Bus 大阪バス
Ōsaka Municipal Transportation Bureau (Ōsaka City Bus) 大阪市交通局 (大阪市営バス) S Pi
Osaka Transportation Promotion 大阪シティバス S
Takatsuki City Transportation Division 高槻市交通部 S
Willer Express ウィラーエクスプレス

Kyōto Prefecture
Chūkyō Kōtsū 中京交通
Hankyū Hanshin Holdings Group 阪急阪神ホールディングスグループ
Tango Kairiku Kōtsū 丹後海陸交通
Keihan Group 京阪グループ
Keihan Bus 京阪バス S
Keihan City Bus 京阪シティバス S
Keihan Kyōto Kōtsū 京阪京都交通 S
Keihan Uji Bus 京阪宇治バス S
Kyōto Bus 京都バス S
Kyōto Kōtsū 京都交通
Kyōto Municipal Transportation Bureau (Kyōto City Bus) 京都市交通局 (京都市営バス) S
Yasaka Bus ヤサカバス

Hyōgo Prefecture
Amagasaki City Transportation Bureau (Amagasaki City Bus) 尼崎市交通局 (尼崎市営バス) S
Amagasaki Transportation Business Promotion 尼崎交通事業振興 S
Awaji Kōtsū 淡路交通
Awaji Taxi 淡路タクシー
Hakuro Taxi はくろタクシー
Hankyū Hanshin Holdings Group 阪急阪神ホールディングスグループ
Hankyū Denen Bus 阪急田園バス S
Hanshin Bus 阪神バス S
Rokkō Maya Railway 六甲摩耶鉄道
Shintetsu Bus 神鉄バス S
Honshi Kaikyou Bus 本四海峡バス
Itami City Transportation Bureau (Itami City Bus) 伊丹市交通局 (伊丹市営バス) S
Kōbe Ferry Bus 神戸フェリーバス
Kōbe Municipal Transportation Bureau (Kōbe City Bus) 神戸市交通局 (神戸市営バス) S
Kōbe City Transportation Promotion 神戸交通振興 S
Minato Kankō Bus (Kōbe) みなと観光バス
Minato Kankō Bus (Minamiawaji) みなと観光バス
These two are unrelated.
Sanyō Group 山陽グループ
Sanyō Bus 山陽バス
Shinki Bus神姫バス Pi
Shinki Green Bus 神姫グリーンバス
Shinki Zone Bus神姫ゾーンバス Pi
West Shinki ウエスト神姫
Zentan Bus 全但バス

Nara Prefecture
Kintetsu Group 近鉄グループ
Nara Kōtsū 奈良交通 Pi
NC Bus エヌシーバス Pi
Yoshino Ōmine Kēburu Bus 吉野大峯ケーブル自動車

Shiga Prefecture
Keihan Group 京阪グループ
Kojak Kōtsū (Kojak Bus) 江若交通 (江若バス)
Seibu Group 西武グループ
Ohmi Railway 近江鉄道
Kokoku Bus 湖国バス
Shiga Agent System シガ・エージェントシステム
Shiga Kōtsū 滋賀交通
Shiga Bus 滋賀バス
Teisan Group 帝産グループ
Teisan Kankō Bus Shiga 帝産観光バス滋賀
Teisan Konan Kōtsū 帝産湖南交通
Teisan Taxi Shiga 帝産タクシー滋賀
Yogo Bus 余呉バス

Wakayama Prefecture
Arida Kōtsū 有田交通
Arida Railway 有田鉄道
Chūki Bus 中紀バス
Daijyū Bus 大十バス
Kintetsu Group 近鉄グループ
Meikō Bus 明光バス
Kōyasan Taxi 高野山タクシー
Kumano Kōtsū 熊野交通
Nankai Group 南海グループ
Gobō Nankai Bus 御坊南海バス
Nankai Rinkan Bus 南海りんかんバス S
Wakayama Bus S 和歌山バス
Wakayama Bus Naga 和歌山バス那賀 S
Ryūjin Jidōsha 龍神自動車
Susami Kôtû すさみ交通

Chūgoku region

Tottori Prefecture
Hinomaru Bus 日ノ丸自動車 (日ノ丸バス)
Hinomaru Hire 日ノ丸ハイヤー
Nihon Kōtsū (Nikkō Bus) 日本交通
Tottori Jidōsha (Clover Bus) 鳥取自動車 (クローバーバス)

Shimane Prefecture
Hankyū Hanshin Holdings Group 阪急阪神ホールディングスグループ
Iwami Kōtsū 石見交通
Ichibata Group 一畑グループ
Ichibata Bus 一畑バス
Izumo Ichibata Kōtsū 出雲一畑交通
Matsue Ichibata Kōtsū 松江一畑交通
Oki Ichibata Kōtsū 隠岐一畑交通
Okuizumo Kōtsū 奥出雲交通
Matsue City Traffic Office (Matsue City Bus) 松江市交通局 (松江市営バス)
Muikaichi Kōtsū 六日市交通
Oki Ama Kōtsū 隠岐海士交通
Oki Kankō 隠岐観光
Susanoo Kankou スサノオ観光
Tanimoto Hire 谷本ハイヤー
Yamato Kankō 大和観光

Okayama Prefecture
Arimoto Kankō Bus 有本観光バス
Chūtetsu Bus 中鉄バス
Chūtetsu Mimasaka Bus 中鉄美作バス
Sōja Bus (Chūtetsu Sōja Bus) 総社バス (中鉄総社バス)
Hinase Transportation (Bizen Bus) 日生運輸 (備前バス)
Hokushin Bus 北振バス
Kamo Kankō Bus 加茂観光バス
Katsumada Kankō Bus 勝間田観光バス
Minagi Kōtsū 美袋交通
Rose Kankoh (Rose Bus) ロウズ観光 (ロウズバス)
Ryōbi Holdings (Ryōbi Bus) 両備ホールディングス (両備バス)
Ikasa Bus Company 井笠バスカンパニー (井笠バス.C)
Okayama Electric Tramway (Okaden Bus) 岡山電気軌道 (岡電バス)
Okayama Kōtsū 岡山交通
Okayama Taxi 岡山タクシー
Tōbi Bus 東備バス
Shimotsui Dentetsu (Shimoden Bus) 下津井電鉄 (下電バス)
Bihoku Bus 備北バス
Shimoden Tour Service シモデンツアーサービス
Toyosawa Kōtsū 豊沢交通
Uno Bus 宇野自動車 (宇野バス)

Hiroshima Prefecture
Angel Cab エンゼルキャブ
Anzen Taxi 安全タクシー
Chiyoda Taxi 千代田タクシー
Chūgoku Bus 中国バス
Daiichi Taxi 第一タクシー
Hamadaya Taxi 浜田屋タクシー
Hiroshima Bus 広島バス
Hiroshima Electric Railway (Hiroden Bus) 広島電鉄 (広電バス)
Bihoku Kōtsū 備北交通
Geiyō Bus 芸陽バス
HD Nishi Hiroshima (Bon-Bus) エイチ・ディー西広島 (ボン・バス)
Hiroshima Kōtsū 広島交通
Hirokō Kankō 広交観光
Honshi Bus Kaihatsu 本四バス開発
Innoshima Unyu (Innoshima Bus) 因の島運輸 (因の島バス)
Iwami Tour イワミツアー
JR Group JRグループ
Chūgoku JR Bus 中国ジェイアールバス
Jūban Kōtsū 十番交通
Kake Kōtsū 加計交通
Mibu Kōtsū 壬生交通
Miyajima Kōtsū 宮島交通
Nōmi Bus 能美バス
Ōasa Kōtsū (Hope Bus) 大朝交通 (ホープバス)
Onomichi Bus おのみちバス
Ōtake Kōtsū Taxi 大竹交通タクシー
Ōtake Taxi 大竹タクシー
Saijō Kōtsū (Rainbow Bus) 西城交通 (レインボーバス)
Saiki Kōtsū 佐伯交通
Sandankyō Kōtsū 三段峡交通
Sanyō Bus さんようバス
Sasaki Kankō ささき観光
Setouchi Sankō 瀬戸内産交
Shōwa Taxi 昭和タクシー
SK Corporation 総合企画コーポレーション
Tomotetsudō (Tomotetsu Bus) 鞆鉄道 (トモテツバス)
Toyohira Kōtsū 豊平交通
Tsuda Kōtsū 津田交通
Yae Taxi 八重タクシー
Yaguchi Taxi やぐちタクシー
Yasuura Kōtsū 安浦交通

Yamaguchi Prefecture
Funaki Railway (Sentetsu Bus) 船木鉄道 (船鉄バス)
Iwakuni Bus いわくにバス
Kintetsu Group 近鉄グループ
Bōchō Kōtsū (Bōchō Bus) 防長交通 (防長バス)
Sanden Kōtsū サンデン交通
Blue Line Kōtsū ブルーライン交通
Ube City Transportation Bureau (Ube City Bus) 宇部市交通局 (宇部市営バス)

Shikoku region

Tokushima Prefecture
Ichiba Kōtsū 市場交通
Kotoden Group ことでんグループ
Tokushima Seibu Kōtsū 徳島西部交通
Mima Kankō Bus 美馬観光バス
Nankai Group 南海グループ
Tokushima Bus 徳島バス
Shikoku Kōtsū 四国交通
Tokushima Bus Anan 徳島バス阿南
Tokushima Bus Nanbu 徳島バス南部
Tokushima City Transportation Bureau (Tokushima City Bus) 徳島市交通局 (徳島市営バス)

Kagawa Prefecture
JR Group JRグループ
JR Shikoku Bus ジェイアール四国バス
Kotoden Group ことでんグループ
Kotoden Bus ことでんバス
Shikoku Kousoku Bus 四国高速バス
Kotohira Bus 琴平バス (コトバス)
Kotosan Corporation (Kotosan Bus) 琴平参宮電鉄 (琴参バス)
Ōkawa Bus 大川自動車
Onigashima Kankō Jidōsha 鬼ヶ島観光自動車
The smallest operator in Japan, with 2 buses.
Shōdoshima Bus 小豆島バス
Takamatsu Express (Foot Bus) 高松エクスプレス (フットバス)

Ehime Prefecture
Iyo Railway 伊予鉄道
Iyotetsu Nanyo Bus 伊予鉄南予バス
Kounan Bus 肱南観光バス
Setouchi Bus 瀬戸内運輸 (せとうちバス)
Setouchi Shūsō Bus せとうち周桑バス
Setonaikai Kōtsū 瀬戸内海交通
Setouchi Shimanami Leading 瀬戸内しまなみリーディング
Uwajima Bus 宇和島自動車 (宇和島バス)

Kōchi Prefecture
Kōch Ekimae Kankō 高知駅前観光
Kōnan Kankō Jidōsha 高南観光自動車
Kuroiwa Kankō 黒岩観光
Reihoku Kankō Zidōsha 嶺北観光自動車
Tosaden Kōtsū とさでん交通
Kenkō Hokubu Kōtsū 県交北部交通
Kōchi Kōryō Kōtsū 高知高陵交通
Kōchi Seinan Kōtsū 高知西南交通
Kōchi Tōbu Kōtsū 高知東部交通

Kyūshū region

Fukuoka Prefecture
Amagi Kankō Bus 甘木観光バス
Chikuhō Kankō Bus 筑豊観光バス
Horikawa Bus 堀川バス
JR Group JRグループ
JR Kyūshū Bus ジェイアール九州バス
Kitakyūshū City Transportation Bureau (Kitakyūshū City Bus) 北九州市交通局 (北九州市営バス)
Nishitetsu Group 西鉄グループ
Kyūshū Kyūkō Bus 九州急行バス
Nishi-Nippon Railroad (Nishitetsu Bus) 西日本鉄道 (西鉄バス)
Nishitetsu Bus Chikuhō 西鉄バス筑豊
Nishitetsu Bus Futsukaichi 西鉄バス二日市
Nishitetsu Bus Kitakyūshū 西鉄バス北九州
Nishitetsu Bus Kurume 西鉄バス久留米
Nishitetsu Bus Munakata 西鉄バス宗像
Nishitetsu Bus Ōmuta 西鉄バス大牟田
Nishitetsu Highway Bus 西鉄高速バス
Nishitetsu Kankō Bus 西鉄観光バス
Nishitetsu Bus is the largest operator in Japan. It owns the fleet of 2,083 buses, or 3,100 by the entire group.
Shōwa Bus 昭和自動車 (昭和バス)
Taiyō Kōtsū 太陽交通
Techno Kankō Bus テクノ観光バス
Ukico ウキコ

Saga Prefecture
Nishitetsu Group 西鉄グループ
Nishitetsu Bus Saga 西鉄バス佐賀
Saga City Transportation Bureau (Saga Shiei Bus) 佐賀市交通局 (佐賀市営バス)
Yūtoku Motor 祐徳自動車

Nagasaki Prefecture
Gotō Motor (Gotō Bus) 五島自動車 (五島バス)
Iki Kōtsū 壱岐交通
Ikitsuki Motor (Ikitsuki Bus) 生月自動車 (生月バス)
Maruhama Sangyō (Narujima Bus) 丸濱産業 (奈留島バス)
Nagasaki Motor Bus (Nagasaki Bus) 長崎自動車 (長崎バス)
Saikai Kōtsū さいかい交通
Ojika Kōtsū 小値賀交通
Ōkawa Rikuun (Hirado Kankō Bus) 大川陸運 (平戸観光バス)
Saihi Motor (Saihi Bus) 西肥自動車 (西肥バス)
Sasebo City Transportation Bureau (Sasebo City Bus) 佐世保市交通局 (佐世保市営バス)
Sasebo Bus させぼバス
Shimabara Railway (Shimatetsu Bus) 島原鉄道 (島鉄バス)
Transportation Bureau of Nagasaki Prefecture (Nagasaki Ken-ei Bus) 長崎県交通局 (長崎県営バス)
Nagasaki Ken-ou Bus 長崎県央バス
Tsushima Kōtsū 対馬交通
Uku Kankō Bus 宇久観光バス
YOKARO YOKARO

Kumamoto Prefecture
Kyūshū Sankō Bus 九州産交バス
Sankō Bus 産交バス
Kumamoto Electric Railway 熊本電気鉄道
Kumamoto Toshi Bus 熊本都市バス
Kumamoto Bus 熊本バス

Ōita Prefecture
Nishitetsu Group 西鉄グループ
Hita Bus 日田バス
Kamenoi Bus 亀の井バス
Ōita Bus 大分バス
Kyūshin Kōtsū 臼津交通
Ōno Kōtsū 大野交通
Takeda Kōtsū 竹田交通
Ōita Kōtsū 大分交通
Daikō Hokubu Bus 大交北部バス
Kunisaki Kankō Bus 国東観光バス
Kusu Kankō Bus 玖珠観光バス

Miyazaki Prefecture
Hakkō Travel ハッコートラベル
Iwasaki Group いわさきグループ
Sanshū Motor 三州自動車
Sun Marine Tourサンマリンツアー
Miyazaki Kōtsū 宮崎交通
Yamaguchi Transportation (Mito Kankō Bus) 山口運送（美登観光バス）

Kagoshima Prefecture
A" Line マルエーフェリー
Daiwa Bus 大和バス
Iwasaki Group いわさきグループ
Amami Iwasaki Sangyō 奄美岩崎産業
Iwasaki Bus Network いわさきバスネットワーク
Kagoshima Kōtsū 鹿児島交通
Tanegashima Yakushima Kōtsū 種子島・屋久島交通
Kagoshima City Transportation Bureau (Kagoshima City Bus) 鹿児島市交通局 (鹿児島市営バス)
Kakeroma Bus 加計呂麻バス
Michinoshima Kōtsū 道の島交通
Minami Kyūshū Kankō Bus 南九州観光バス
Minami Rikuun (Minami Bus) 南陸運 (南バス)
Nangoku Kōtsū 南国交通
Okinoerabu Bus Enterprises (Oki Bus) 沖永良部バス企業団 (沖バス)
Satsumasendai City Industrial Economy Division Commerce And Industry Promotion Section (Satsumasendai City Bus) 薩摩川内市産業経済部商工振興課 (薩摩川内市営バス)
Tokunoshima Sōgō Rikuun (Sōgō Bus) 徳之島総合陸運 (総合バス)

Okinawa Prefecture
Azuma Un'yu (Azuma Bus) 東運輸 (東バス)
Hokubu Kankō Bus 北部観光バス
Iejima Kankō Bus 伊江島観光バス
Iriomotejima Kōtsū 西表島交通
The southernmost operator.
Karry Kankō カリー観光
Kohama Kōtsū コハマ交通
Kyōwa Bus 共和バス
Miyako Kyōei Bus 宮古協栄バス
Naha Bus 那覇バス
Okinawa Bus 沖縄バス
Ryūkyū Bus Kōtsū 琉球バス交通
Tōyō Bus 東陽バス
Yachiyo Bus Taxi 八千代バス・タクシー
Yonaguni Kōtsū ヨナグニ交通

See also

List of bus operating companies
:ja:日本のコミュニティバス一覧 (List of community buses in Japan)
:ja:日本のバス (Buses in Japan)
List of railway companies in Japan
List of defunct railway companies in Japan
List of aerial lifts in Japan

 
Japan
Japan transport-related lists